Patrizi is the name of:

Antonio Patrizi (1280-1311), Italian Roman Catholic priest 
Francesco Patrizi of Siena (1413–1494), Italian political writer, humanist and bishop
Agostino Patrizi de Piccolomini (died 1495), Roman Catholic prelate
Franciscus Patricius (1529–1597), philosopher and scientist from the Republic of Venice
Francis Xavier Patrizi (1797–1881), Italian Jesuit exegete
Costantino Patrizi Naro (1798–1876), Italian Cardinal
Michael Patrizi (born 1984), Australian race driver
Hayden Patrizi (born 1985), Australian-born Italian cricketer